Eman Fiala may refer to:

 Eman Fiala (actor) (1899–1970), Czech actor and composer
 Eman Fiala (film), a 1961 Czech film